Lorik Emini (born 29 August 1999) is a professional footballer who plays as a midfielder for Swiss club Luzern. Born in Switzerland, he represents the Kosovo national team.

Club career

Luzern
On 29 September 2019, Emini was named as a Luzern substitute for the first time in a Swiss Super League match against Basel. His professional debut with Luzern came on 1 December in a 1–4 home defeat against St. Gallen after coming on as a substitute at 90th minute in place of compatriot Idriz Voca.

International career
During 2014, Emini has been part of Switzerland at youth international level, respectively has been part of the U15 and U16 teams and he with these teams played six matches. On 25 May 2021, Emini received a call-up from Kosovo for the friendly matches against San Marino and Malta. Seven days later, he made his debut with Kosovo in a friendly match against San Marino after coming on as a substitute at 71st minute in place of Besar Halimi.

References

External links 

Lorik Emini at Swiss Football League

1999 births
Living people
People from Zug
Sportspeople from the canton of Zug
Kosovan men's footballers
Kosovo international footballers
Kosovan expatriate footballers
Kosovan expatriate sportspeople in Switzerland
Swiss men's footballers
Switzerland youth international footballers
Swiss people of Kosovan descent
Swiss people of Albanian descent
Association football midfielders
Swiss Super League players
FC Luzern players